Little Goose Lock and Dam is a hydroelectric, concrete, run-of-the-river dam in the northwest United States, on the lower Snake River in southeast Washington.

Construction began in June 1963 on what was Little Goose Island. The main structure and three generators were completed  in 1970, with an additional three generators finished in 1978.

Little Goose Dam is part of the Columbia River Basin system of dams.

Lake Bryan, named for Doctor Enoch Albert Bryan, is formed behind the dam.

Navigation lock
 Single-lift
  wide
  long

See also 

List of dams in the Columbia River watershed
Lower Granite Dam
Ice Harbor Dam
Lower Monumental Dam
 Little Goose Dam in Grand Forks County, North Dakota

References

External links 

 Little Goose Lock & Dam @ US Army Corps of Engineers

Dams completed in 1970
Energy infrastructure completed in 1970
Energy infrastructure completed in 1978
Buildings and structures in Columbia County, Washington
Dams in Washington (state)
Hydroelectric power plants in Washington (state)
Buildings and structures in Whitman County, Washington
Run-of-the-river power stations
United States Army Corps of Engineers dams
Dams on the Snake River
Gravity dams